Sakri Junction, station code SKI, is the railway station serving the city of Madhubani in the Madhubani district in the Indian state of Bihar. The Sakri Jn railway station is known as one of the Indian Railway's top 100 teach price ticket and train travel stations. Seventy-two trains pass through the Sakri Jn (SKI) junction in total.

Platforms 
There are three platforms in Sakri Junction. The platforms are interconnected with foot overbridges.

Nearest airport
The nearest airport to Darbhanga Junction is
 Darbhanga Airport, Darbhanga
 Lok Nayak Jayaprakash Airport, Patna
 Gaya Airport, Gaya

See also
 Darbhanga Junction
 Samastipur Junction
 Muzaffarpur Junction

References

External links
 

Railway stations in Madhubani district
Railway junction stations in Bihar
Samastipur railway division